Mersin İdmanyurdu (also Mersin İdman Yurdu, Mersin İY, or MİY) Sports Club; located in Mersin, east Mediterranean coast of Turkey in 1964-1965.  The 1964–65 season was the 2nd season of Mersin İdmanyurdu football team in Second League, the second level division in Turkey. The team finished 1964–65 Second League at third place. The team also participated in 1964–65 Turkish Cup (Türkiye Kupası) and was eliminated at third round.

The club name was Çukurova İdmanyurdu due to sponsorship reasons. The president of the club was Mehmet Karamehmet. Head coach was İlhan Taşucu. The season started with Spor-Toto Cup games in August 1964 and ended with the last round game on 3 April 1965. The most appeared player was Hüseyin İlgin, while top goalscorer was Alp Sümeralp.

Pre-season
 Preparation games: ÇİY- Tarsus K.: 3-2. ÇİY-Tarsus K.: 3-2.
 Spor-Toto Cup: 30.08.1964 - Adana Demirspor-ÇİY: 2-1. Sunday, 16:00. Adana.

1964–65 Second League participation
In its second season, 1964–65 Second League was played by 16 teams, 11 from previous season, three relegated from first league, one from amateur championship, and one other professionalized team from Anatolia. The league season started on 5 September 1964 and finished on 4 April 1965. Winner of the league promoted to First League 1965–-66. No team relegated due to expansion demands.

Çukurova İdmanyurdu finished third with 18 wins and 42 goals.

Results summary
Mersin İdmanyurdu (MİY) 1964–65 Second League summary:

Sources: 1964–65 Turkish Second Football League pages.

League table
Second League 1964–65 season game results of Çukurova İdmanyurdu (ÇİY) vs other team are shown in league table below:

Two points for a win. Rules for classification: 1) points; 2) goal difference; 3) number of goals scored. In the score columns first scores belong to ÇİY.(P): Promoted to 1965–66 Turkish First Football League; (R): Relegated to Regional Amateur League. No team relegated.Sources: 1964–65 Turkish Second Football League pages.

Results by round
Results of games MİY played in 1964–65 Second League Red Group by rounds:

First half
Mersin İdmanyurdu (MİY) 1964–65 Second League season first half game reports is shown in the following table.
Kick off times are in EET and EEST.

Sources: 1964–65 Turkish Second Football League pages.

ÇİY finished first half of the season as leader with 22 points. Second was Beyoğluspor with 21 points. League winner Vefa finished 7th with 16 points and runner up Bursaspor 4th with 18 points. Third place Karşıyaka 19 points. 5- Karagümrük 18. 6-Ülküspor 17. 8- Sarıyer 15. 9- Kasımpaşa 15, 10- Altındağ 14. 11- Petrolspor 14. 12- Adana Demirspor 14. 13- Beylerbeyi 11. 14- Yeşildirek 11. 15- Güneşspor 10. 16- Manisa Sakaryaspor 5.

Mid-season
In the mid-season MİY played two games against national army team who camped in Mersin.

Sources: 1964–65 Turkish Second Football League pages.

Second half
Mersin İdmanyurdu (MİY) 1963–64 Second League season second half game reports is shown in the following table.
Kick off times are in EET and EEST.

Sources: 1964–65 Turkish Second Football League pages.

1964–65 Turkish Cup participation
The third Turkish Cup was played by 67 teams: 16 First League teams, 16 Second League teams, 19 teams from regional leagues, and 16 teams from amateurs. Galatasaray won the cup for the third time and became eligible for playing ECW Cup games next year. ÇİY, being a Second League team, has participated in Cup starting from Round 2 preliminary round, and eliminated in Round 3 second preliminary round.

Cup track
The drawings and results Mersin İdmanyurdu (MİY) followed in 1964–65 Turkish Cup are shown in the following table.

Note: In the above table 'Score' shows For and Against goals whether the match played at home or not.

Game details
Mersin İdmanyurdu (MİY) 1964–65 Turkish Cup game reports is shown in the following table.
Kick off times are in EET and EEST.

Source: 1964–65 Turkish Cup pages.

Management

Club management
Executive committee:
 Mehmet Karamehmet, H. M. Karamehmet, Erol Tarhan, Reşat Demir, Kemal Evrim, Kemal Kürklü, İbrahim Tinli, Edip Ergin, Halit Gazioğlu.

Coaching team
Head coach was İlhan Taşucu. Manager: Hüseyin Tinli. Trainer: Nazım Koka.

1964–65 Mersin İdmanyurdu head coaches:

Note: Only official games were included.

1964–65 squad
Stats are counted for 1964–65 Second League matches and 1964–65 Turkish Cup (Türkiye Kupası) matches. In the team rosters four substitutes were allowed to appear, two of whom were substitutable. Only the players who appeared in game rosters were included and listed in the order of appearance.

Sources: 1964–65 season squad data from maçkolik com, Milliyet, and Erbil (1975).

See also
 Football in Turkey
 1964–65 Turkish Second Football League
 1964–65 Turkish Cup

Notes and references

Mersin İdman Yurdu seasons
Turkish football clubs 1964–65 season